Zofia Teresa Noceti-Klepacka (born 26 April 1986) is a Polish windsurfer and a political far-right media personality.

She won the Windsurfing World Championships in 2007 and participated in three editions of the Olympic Games, winning the bronze medal at the 2012 Summer Olympics.

Achievements

Personal life
She grew up in Warsaw, in one of the tenement houses on Marszałkowska Street. Since childhood, she has been a supporter of Legia Warsaw, where her father took her to the stadium. In 2009 she married the Argentine sailor Lucio Noceti, with whom she has a son Marian (born 2009). In 2012 the couple separated, in 2019 divorced. She has a daughter, Maria (born 2013) with Michał Pater.

Controversies 

In February 2019, she criticized the Mayor of Warsaw Rafał Trzaskowski and the "LGBT+ declaration" signed by him. She published on her social media "No on has the right to impose on our children something we parents don’t want!!!!". Klepacka's comments received hundreds of reactions, including many from fans in agreement with her stance. She also applauded a right wing publication that equated LGBT people to Nazis. She is also a vociferous opponent of abortion. In 2019 she featured in a far-right propaganda video on YouTube which was later taken down for inciting hatred.

References

External links
 
 
 
 

1986 births
Living people
Polish windsurfers
Sailors at the 2004 Summer Olympics – Mistral One Design
Sailors at the 2008 Summer Olympics – RS:X
Sailors at the 2012 Summer Olympics – RS:X
Olympic sailors of Poland
Polish female sailors (sport)
Polish Roman Catholics
Sportspeople from Warsaw
Olympic bronze medalists for Poland
Olympic medalists in sailing
Medalists at the 2012 Summer Olympics
Female windsurfers
Sailors at the 2020 Summer Olympics – RS:X
RS:X class world champions